The 1942 Tschammerpokal was the 8th season of the annual German football cup competition. During this competition, 64 teams competed in the final tournament stage of six rounds. At the finals, which were held on 15 November 1942, the Olympiastadion 1860 Munich defeated Schalke 04 2–0.

Matches

First round

Replay

Second round

Round of 16

Quarter-finals

Semi-finals

Final

References

External links
 Official site of the DFB 
 Kicker.de 
 Tschammerpokal at Fussballberichte.de 

1942
1942 in German football cups